Colorado Springs 1998 is a complete concert by Athens, Georgia's Widespread Panic on CD.  The performance was recorded live at the City Auditorium Arena in Colorado Springs, Colorado on October 20, 1998.  The multi-track recordings featured all original band members including late guitarist Michael Houser.

Track listing

Disc 1
 "Goin' Out West" (Kathleen Brennan / Tom Waits) - 6:17
 "Radio Child" (Widespread Panic) - 5:31
 "Ride Me High" (J.J. Cale) - 10:06
 "Disco" (Widespread Panic) - 4:43
 "Airplane" (Widespread Panic) - 10:57
 "C. Brown" (Widespread Panic) - 7:30
 "Holden Oversoul" (Widespread Panic) - 7:30
 "Sleepy Monkey" (Widespread Panic) - 7:17
 "Postcard" (Widespread Panic) - 4:41

Disc 2
 "Climb to Safety" (Jerry Joseph/Glen Esparaza) - 7:20
 "Tall Boy" (Widespread Panic) - 7:11
 "Walk On" (Neil Young) - 5:47
 "Nobody's Loss" (Widespread Panic) - 6:12
 "Blight" (Vic Chesnutt / Michael Houser / Todd Nance / Dave Schools) - 5:56
 "Chilly Water" (Widespread Panic) - 7:33
 "Impossible" (Widespread Panic) - 13:45

Disc 3
 "Drums" (Widespread Panic) - 15:02
 "Big Wooly Mammoth" (Widespread Panic) - 6:19
 "Chilly Water (Reprise)"  (Widespread Panic) - 4:55
 "End of the Show"  (Daniel Hutchens / Eric Carter)- 5:14
 "Ain't Life Grand"  (Widespread Panic) - 5:02

Personnel

Widespread Panic
  John Bell - Vocals, Guitar
 Michael Houser - Guitar, Vocals
 Dave Schools - Bass
 Todd Nance - Drums
 John "Jojo" Hermann - Keyboards, Vocals
 Domingo "Sunny" Ortiz - Percussion

Personnel
 Mixed by Chris Rabold and Drew Vandenberg at Chase Park Transduction Studios in Athens, GA.
 Recorded by Danny Friedman
 Packaging by Chris Bilheimer

References

External links
 Widespread Panic website
 Widespread Panic Archives Blog

2011 live albums
Widespread Panic live albums